Samuel Jack Ling (born 17 December 1996) is an English professional footballer who plays as a defender for National League club Dagenham & Redbridge.

Career
Ling began his career at Leyton Orient, progressing through the O's academy to become Youth Team captain and also featured on the bench for the first-team a number of times. He moved to Dagenham & Redbridge in 2016. On 7 February 2018, he returned to fellow National League and former club Leyton Orient for an undisclosed fee, signing a two-and-a-half year contract. Ling was one of a number of players to leave Dagenham due to the club's financial issues. His father, Martin, was also director of football at Orient. He made his long-awaited debut for the club on February 17, coming on as a substitute in the second-half against Chester. He scored his first goal for the club  on 15 March 2019 in a 3–2 away win at Barrow. He played a key role at right-back as Orient won the National League title at the end of the 2018–19 season. Ling started the 2019–20 season well and was nominated for the Orient's Player of the Month award in August. On 9 September 2019 he signed a new one-year extension to his contract until the summer of 2021. He had been an ever-present in the side since promotion and their return to the English Football League. He made his 50th appearance for the club on 21 September 2019 in a 2–1 defeat to Colchester United. He made a total of 87 appearances for Orient in three-and-a-half seasons before he was released in the summer of 2021 following the expiration of his contract.

On 9 July 2021, Ling returned to National League side Dagenham & Redbridge on a free transfer. Daggers boss, Daryl McMahon, spoke of his acquisition, "He obviously comes from a good footballing family, with his dad Martin. I've known Sam since he was about five or six, from when I played for Martin at Leyton Orient. He's been at the football club before and did really well here, so we know what we're getting."

Personal life
His father is Martin Ling.

Career statistics

Honours
Leyton Orient
National League: 2018–19
FA Trophy runner-up: 2018–19

References

External links
Sam Ling at Soccerway

Living people
1996 births
People from Broxbourne
Association football defenders
Leyton Orient F.C. players
Grays Athletic F.C. players
Histon F.C. players
Dagenham & Redbridge F.C. players
English footballers
English Football League players
National League (English football) players
Southern Football League players